The 2023 Czech presidential election debates are a series of debates held for the 2023 Czech presidential election.

List of debates

Polls and Surveys
This section lists surveys or polls about who was the most convincing in each debate. Note that some of these may not have been professionally weighted.

Notes

References 

Debates
Czech presidential debates